Richard W. Shorthill was an American academic who was a professor of mechanical engineering at the University of Utah.

Early life and education 
Shorthill attended the University of Utah and received a B.A. in 1954 and a PhD in 1960.

Shorthill married Ellen and they had two children together.

Career 
Shorthill started his career with Boeing as a researcher. At Boeing, he worked on the Viking and Apollo space programs.

In 1999, he received the Franklin Institute Award along with Victor Vali for his work on the fiber optic gyroscope.

References

1928 births
2012 deaths
University of Utah alumni
University of Utah faculty